Qurchi, also Kypim, is a major town in Bilchiragh District in the Faryab Province, in northern Afghanistan. It lies west of Negala. The town has a significant Uzbek population.

History
The town was occupied by Maimana officers in 1888.

Norwegian soldiers were attacked in Qurchi in July 2010.

References

Populated places in Faryab Province